The Concerto for Orchestra, Sz. 116, BB 123, is a five-movement orchestral work composed by Béla Bartók in 1943. It is one of his best-known, most popular, and most accessible works.

The score is inscribed "15 August – 8 October 1943". It was premiered on December 1, 1944, in Symphony Hall, Boston, by the Boston Symphony Orchestra conducted by Serge Koussevitzky. It was a great success and has been regularly performed since.

It is perhaps the best-known of a number of pieces that have the apparently contradictory title Concerto for Orchestra. This is in contrast to the conventional concerto form, which features a solo instrument with orchestral accompaniment. Bartók said that he called the piece a concerto rather than a symphony because of the way each section of instruments is treated in a soloistic and virtuosic way.

Composition
The work was written in response to a commission from the Koussevitzky Foundation (run by the conductor Serge Koussevitzky) following Bartók's move to the United States from his native Hungary, which he had fled because of World War II. It has been speculated that Bartók's previous work, the String Quartet No. 6 (1939), could well have been his last were it not for this commission, which sparked a small number of other compositions, including his Sonata for Solo Violin and Piano Concerto No. 3.

Bartók revised the piece in February 1945, the biggest change coming in the last movement, where he wrote a longer ending. Both versions of the ending were published, but the revised ending is almost universally performed.

As recalled for example in
https://www.gustavodudamel.com/us-en/bartk-br-concerto-for-orchestra
Bartok was in hospital, suffering from what would later be discovered to be leukemia, when Serge Koussevitzky visited 
him to personally inform him of the commission for him to write the work which
would become this concerto. 
As recorded elsewhere, following Koussevitzky's visit, Bartok was so moved to receive this commission that, despite his difficult medical condition, he simply got up and
walked out of the hospital, to begin working on his new composition.

Instrumentation 
The piece is scored for the following instrumentation.

Woodwinds
3 flutes (one doubling piccolo)
3 oboes (one doubling cor anglais)
3 clarinets (one doubling bass clarinet)
3 bassoons (one doubling contrabassoon)

Brass
4 horns
3 trumpets
3 trombones
1 tuba

Percussion
Timpani

Side drum
Bass drum
Cymbals
Triangle
Tam-tam

Strings
Violins I, II
Violas
Cellos
Double basses

2 harps

Musical analysis

The piece is in five movements:

Bartók makes extensive use of classical elements in the work; for instance, the first and fifth movements are in sonata-allegro form.

The work combines elements of Western art music and eastern European folk music, especially that of Hungary, and it departs from traditional tonality, often using non-traditional modes and artificial scales. Bartók researched folk melodies, and their influence is felt throughout the work. For example, the second main theme of the first movement, as played by the first oboe, resembles a folk melody, with its narrow range and almost haphazard rhythm. The drone in the horns and strings also indicates folk influence (see example).

I. Introduzione 
The first movement, Introduzione, is a slow introduction of Night music type that gives way to an allegro with numerous fugato passages. This movement is in sonata-allegro form.

II. Presentando le coppie
The second movement is called "Game of Pairs" (but see note below). Its main part  consists of five sections, each thematically distinct from the others, with a different pair of instruments playing together in each section. In each passage, a different interval separates the pair—bassoons are a minor sixth apart, oboes are in minor thirds, clarinets in minor sevenths, flutes in fifths, and muted trumpets in major seconds. The movement prominently features a side drum that taps out a rhythm at the beginning and end of this part. In fact this main part is played twice. Careful listening will reveal some small differences when it is played the second time. In between the first and second playing of this part there is a short interlude which to some listeners (including some who write cover notes for recordings of this work) suggests a kind of marriage ceremony. 
So one can imagine that, when the main part is played a second time, the five couples that appeared earlier are now married.

While the printed score titles the second movement "Giuoco delle coppie" or "Game of the couples", Bartók's manuscript had no title at all for this movement at the time the engraving-copy blueprint was made for the publisher. At some later date, Bartók added the words "Presentando le coppie" or "Presentation of the couples" to the manuscript and the addition of this title was included in the list of corrections to be made to the score. However, in Bartók's file blueprint the final title is found, and because it is believed to have been the composer's later thought, it is retained in the revised edition of the score.

The original 1946 printed score also had an incorrect metronome marking for this movement. This was brought to light by Sir Georg Solti as he was preparing to record the piece with the Chicago Symphony Orchestra in 1980:

Despite Solti's assertion that thousands of earlier performances had been played at the wrong speed, both of Fritz Reiner's recordings – his 1946 recording with the Pittsburgh Symphony Orchestra (the first recording of the work), as well as his 1955 recording with the Chicago Symphony Orchestra (the same orchestra whose side drum player called the matter to Solti's attention) – had been played at the speed (crotchet equals 94) that Solti later recommended. Reiner had known Bartok since 1905, when they were fellow students at the Budapest Academy. And years later, in 1943, it was Reiner, along with Joseph Szigeti, who persuaded Serge Koussevitsky to commission Bartok to write the Concerto for Orchestra.<ref>Morgan, Kenneth (2005). Fritz Reiner, Maestro and Martinet, p. 120. University of Illinois Press, Champaign. .</ref>

III. Elegia
The third movement, "Elegia", is another slow movement, typical of Bartók's so-called "Night music". The movement revolves around three themes which derive primarily from the first movement.

IV. Intermezzo interrotto
The fourth movement, "Intermezzo interrotto" (literally "interrupted intermezzo"), consists of a flowing melody with changing time signatures, intermixed with a theme that quotes the song "Da geh' ich zu Maxim" from Franz Lehár's operetta The Merry Widow, which had recently also been referenced in the 'invasion' theme of Dmitri Shostakovich's Symphony No. 7 "Leningrad". Whether Bartók was parodying Lehár, Shostakovich, or both has been hotly disputed, without any clinching evidence either way. The theme is itself interrupted by glissandi on the trombones and woodwinds.

In this movement, the timpani are featured when the second theme is introduced, requiring 10 different pitches of the timpani over the course of 20 seconds. The general structure is "ABA–interruption–BA."

V. Finale
The fifth movement, marked presto, consists of a whirling perpetuum mobile main theme competing with fugato fireworks and folk melodies. This is also in sonata-allegro form.

Recordings

The following are only a small selection of the numerous available recordings.
Recorded on 4–5 February 1946, with Fritz Reiner conducting the Pittsburgh Symphony Orchestra. Columbia Masterworks M-793 (78 rpm). Columbia Records later released a 12-inch LP recording. Columbia ML 4102 (monaural). New York: Columbia.
In 1953, Columbia Records released a recording with Herbert von Karajan conducting the Philharmonia Orchestra. 12-inch LP recording. Columbia 33CX 1054 (monaural). London: Columbia Records.
In 1954, Columbia Records released a recording with Eugene Ormandy conducting the Philadelphia Orchestra. 12-inch LP recording. Columbia ML 4973 (monaural). New York: Columbia.
 In 1958, RCA Victor issued a recording with Fritz Reiner conducting the Chicago Symphony Orchestra. 12-inch LP recording. RCA Victor LSC-1934
In 1956, Decca Records released a recording with Ernest Ansermet conducting the Orchestre de la Suisse Romande, also including Frank Martin's Concerto for seven winds, percussion, and string orchestra. Decca LXT 5305; London CS-6086; Decca Eclipse (stereo). London: Decca.
 In 1959, EMI Records released a recording with Rafael Kubelik conducting the Royal Philharmonic Orchestra, also including Bartók's Two Portraits, Op. 5. 12-inch LP recording. HMV ASD 312 (stereo). UK: His Master's Voice.
In 1960, Columbia Records released a recording with Leonard Bernstein conducting the New York Philharmonic Orchestra, recorded at St. George Hotel, Brooklyn, New York, November 30, 1959. 12-inch LP recording. Columbia MS 6140 (stereo). New York: Columbia Records. 
In 1962, RCA Victor released a recording with Erich Leinsdorf conducting the Boston Symphony Orchestra, made in Symphony Hall, Boston. 12-inch LP recording. RCA Victor LSC-2643. New York: RCA Victor.
 1963, Czech Philharmonic Orchestra, Karel Ančerl. Dvorak Hall, Prague. Supraphon. 
In 1965, Columbia Records released a recording with George Szell conducting the Cleveland Orchestra, also including Leoš Janáček's Sinfonietta. 12-inch LP recording. Columbia ML 6215 (stereo). New York: Columbia.
In 1965, Decca Records released a recording with Georg Solti conducting the London Symphony Orchestra. 12-inch LP recording. Decca SXL 6212 (stereo).
In 1979, RCA Red Seal released the first digital recording of the work with Eugene Ormandy conducting the Philadelphia Orchestra. RCA Red Seal ARC1-3421
Recorded in Orchestra Hall, Chicago in January 1981, Sir Georg Solti conducting the Chicago Symphony Orchestra. Digital recording, coupled with Mussorgsky, Pictures at an Exhibition, orchestrated by Ravel, Decca 417 754-2.
In 2012, Naxos Records released a recording with Marin Alsop conducting the Baltimore Symphony Orchestra in addition to Bartók's Music for Strings, Percussion, and Celesta. Digital recording. Naxos 8.572486.

Piano reduction

In 1985, Peter Bartók, son of the composer, discovered a manuscript of a piano, two-hands reduction of the score, in the large body of material which had been left to him upon his father's death. This version had been prepared for rehearsals of a ballet interpretation of the Concerto, to be performed by the Ballet Theatre in New York. This performance never took place, and the piano score was shelved. Soon after the discovery of this manuscript, Peter Bartók asked the Hungarian pianist György Sándor to prepare the manuscript for publication and performance. The world premiere recording of this edited reduction was made by György Sándor in 1987, on CBS Masterworks: the CD also includes piano versions of the Dance Suite, Sz. 77 and Petite Suite, Sz. 105, which was adapted from some of the 44 Violin Duos.

References

Further reading
Fosler-Lussier, Danielle (2000). "Bartók's Concerto for Orchestra in Postwar Hungary: A Road Not Taken." International Journal of Musicology, vol. 9, pp. 363–383. 
French, Gilbert G. (1967). "Continuity and Discontinuity in Bartók's Concerto for Orchestra." The Music Review, vol. 28, pp. 122–134.
Móricz, Klára (1993-1994). "New Aspects of the Genesis of Béla Bartók's 'Concerto for Orchestra': Concepts of 'Finality' and 'Intention.'" Studia Musicologica Academiae Scientiarum Hungaricae, T. 35, Fasc. 1/3, pp. 181–219. 
Parker, Beverly Lewis (1989). "Parallels between Bartók's 'Concerto for Orchestra' and Kübler-Ross's Theory about the Dying." The Musical Quarterly, vol. 73, no. 4, pp. 532–556. 
Suchoff, Benjamin (2000). "Background and Sources of Bartók's Concerto for Orchestra." International Journal of Musicology'', vol. 9, pp. 339–361.

External links
 

Modernist compositions
Music commissioned by Serge Koussevitzky or the Koussevitzky Music Foundation
Concertos by Béla Bartók
Bartok, Concerto for orchestra
1943 compositions